Essential tremor (ET), also called benign tremor, familial tremor, and idiopathic tremor, is a medical condition characterized by involuntary rhythmic contractions and relaxations (oscillations or twitching movements) of certain muscle groups in one or more body parts of unknown cause. It is typically symmetrical, and affects the arms, hands, or fingers; but sometimes involves the head, vocal cords, or other body parts.  Essential tremor is either an action (intention) tremor—it intensifies when one tries to use the affected muscles during voluntary movements such as eating and writing—or it is a postural tremor, present with sustained muscle tone. This means that it is distinct from a resting tremor, such as that caused by Parkinson's disease, which is not correlated with movement.

Essential tremor is a progressive neurological disorder, and the most common movement disorder. Its onset is usually after age 40, but it can occur at any age. The cause is unknown. Diagnosis is by observing the typical pattern of the tremor coupled with the exclusion of known causes of such a tremor.

While essential tremor is distinct from Parkinson's disease, which causes a resting tremor, essential tremor is nevertheless sometimes misdiagnosed as Parkinson's disease. Some patients have been found to have both essential tremors and resting tremors.

Treatments for essential tremor include medications, typically given sequentially to determine which provides the best compromise between effectiveness and troublesome side effects. Clostridium botulinum toxin (Botox) injections and ultrasound are also sometimes used for cases refractory to medications.

Signs and symptoms
In mild cases, ET can manifest as the inability to stop the tongue or hands from shaking, the ability to sing only in vibrato, and difficulty doing small, precise tasks such as threading a needle. Even simple tasks such as cutting in a straight line or using a ruler can range from difficult to impossible, depending on the severity of the condition. In disabling cases, ET can interfere with a person's activities of daily living, including feeding, dressing, and taking care of personal hygiene. Essential tremor generally presents as a rhythmic tremor (4–12 Hz) that occurs only when the affected muscle is exerting effort. Any sort of physical or mental stress tends to make the tremor worse.

The tremor may also occur in the head (neck), jaw, and voice, as well as other body regions, with the general pattern being that the tremor begins in the arms and then spreads to these other regions in some people. Women are more likely to develop the head tremor than are men. Other types of tremor may also occur, including postural tremor of the outstretched arms, intention tremor of the arms, and rest tremor in the arms. Some people may have unsteadiness and problems with gait and balance.

ET-related tremors do not occur during sleep, but people with ET sometimes complain of an especially coarse tremor upon awakening that becomes noticeably less coarse within the first few minutes of wakefulness. Tremor and disease activity/intensity can worsen in response to fatigue, strong emotions, low blood sugar, cold and heat, caffeine, lithium salts, some antidepressants, and other factors. Typically, the tremor worsens in "performance" situations, such as when writing a cheque for payment at a store or giving a presentation.

Parkinson's disease and parkinsonism can also occur simultaneously with ET. The degree of tremor, rigidity, and functional disability did not differ from patients with idiopathic Parkinson's disease. Hand tremor predominated (as it did in Parkinson's disease), and occurred in nearly all cases, followed by head tremor, voice tremor, neck, face, leg, tongue, and trunk tremor. Most other tremors occurred in association with hand tremor. More severe tremors, a lower sleep disorder frequency, and a similar prevalence of other non-motor symptoms also can occur.

Walking difficulties in essential tremor are common. About half of patients have associated dystonia, including cervical dystonia, writer's cramp, spasmodic dysphonia, and cranial dystonia, and 20% of the patients had associated parkinsonism. Olfactory dysfunction (loss of sense of smell) is common in Parkinson's disease, and has also been reported to occur in patients with essential tremor. A number of patients with essential tremor also exhibit many of the same neuropsychiatric disturbances seen in idiopathic Parkinson's disease.

Essential tremor with tremor onset after the age of 65 has been associated with mild cognitive impairment, as well as dementia; although the link between these conditions, if any, is still not understood.

Essential tremor has two tremor components,  central and peripheral. These two tremor components were identified by measuring the tremor of ET patients once with no weights on their hands and then with 1-lb weights on their hands. The addition of the weights resulted in a tremor spectrum with two peaks, one that maintained the same frequency (the central tremor) and one that decreased in frequency (the peripheral tremor). Only with the addition of the weights was the peripheral tremor distinguishable from the central tremor.

The frequency of essential tremor is 4 to 11 Hz, depending on which body segment is affected. Proximal segments are affected at lower frequencies, and distal segments are affected at higher frequencies.

Cause

Genetic
The underlying cause of essential tremor is not clear, but many cases seem to be familial. About half of the cases are due to a genetic mutation and the pattern of inheritance is most consistent with autosomal dominant transmission. No genes have been identified yet, but genetic linkage has been established with several chromosomal regions.

Toxins
Some environmental factors, including toxins, are also under active investigation, as they may play a role in the disease's cause.

Pathophysiology
In terms of pathophysiology, clinical, physiological and imaging studies point to an involvement of the cerebellum and/or cerebellothalamocortical circuits. Changes in the cerebellum could also be mediated by alcoholic beverage consumption. Purkinje cells are especially susceptible to ethanol excitotoxicity. Impairment of Purkinje synapses is a component of cerebellar degradation that could underlie essential tremor. Some cases have Lewy bodies in the locus ceruleus. ET cases that progress to Parkinson's disease are less likely to have had cerebellar problems. Recent neuroimaging studies have suggested that the efficiency of the overall brain functional network in ET is disrupted.

In 2012, the National Toxicology Program concluded that sufficient evidence exists of an association between blood lead exposure at levels >10 μg/dl and essential tremor in adults, and limited evidence at blood lead levels >5 μg/dl.

Genetics
Recent post mortem studies have evidenced alterations in (leucine-rich repeat and Ig domain containing 1 (LINGO1) gene and GABA receptors in the cerebellum of people with essential tremor.  HAPT1 mutations have also been linked to ET, as well as to Parkinson's disease, multiple system atrophy, and progressive supranuclear palsy.

Diagnosis
Usually, the diagnosis is established on clinical grounds. Tremors can start at any age, from birth through advanced ages (senile tremor). Any voluntary muscle in the body may be affected, although the tremor is most commonly seen in the hands and arms and slightly less commonly in the neck (causing the person's head to shake), tongue, and legs. A resting tremor of the hands is sometimes present. Tremor occurring in the legs might be diagnosable as orthostatic tremor.

ET occurs within multiple neurological disorders besides Parkinson's disease. This includes migraine disorders, where co-occurrences between ET and migraines have been examined.

Treatment

General measures
Not all individuals with ET require treatment, but  many treatment options are available depending on symptom severity.  Caffeine and stress should be avoided, and adequate good-quality sleep is recommended.

Oral medications

First-line
When symptoms are sufficiently troublesome to warrant treatment, the first medication choices are beta blockers such as propranolol or alternately, nadolol and timolol. Atenolol and pindolol are not effective for tremor. Sotalol has shown some potential efficacy but this remains an off-label use. The anticonvulsant primidone may also be effective.  ET is generally responsive to alcohol, but the risks of regular drinking are greater than the potential benefit. Nonetheless, ET patients sometimes self-medicate with alcohol.

Propranolol and primidone only have tremor-reducing effects on about half of ET patients, and the effects are moderate.

Second-line
Second-line medications are the anticonvulsants topiramate, gabapentin (as monotherapy) or levetiracetam, or  benzodiazepines such as alprazolam.

Third-line
Third-line medications are clonazepam and mirtazapine.

Fourth-line
Theophylline has been used by some practitioners to treat ET, though it may also induce tremor.  However, its use is debated due to conflicting data on its efficacy.  Some evidence shows that low doses may lead to improvement.

Ethanol has shown superior efficacy to those of benzodiazepines in small trials. It improves tremor in small doses and its effects are usually noticeable within 20 minutes for 3–5 hours, but occasionally appears in a rebound tremor augmentation later.

Some systematic reviews of medications for the treatment of ET have been conducted.  A 2017 review of topiramate found limited data and low quality evidence to support its efficacy and the occurrence of treatment-limiting adverse effects, a 2017 review of zonisamide found insufficient information to assess efficacy and safety, and a 2016 review of pregabalin determined the effects to be uncertain due to the low quality of evidence.

Botulinum injection
When medications do not control the tremor or the person does not tolerate medication, C. botulinum toxin, deep brain stimulation, or occupational therapy can be helpful. The electrodes for deep brain stimulation are usually placed in the  "tremor center" of the brain, the ventral intermediate nucleus of the thalamus.

Ultrasound
Additionally, MRI-guided high-intensity focused ultrasound is a nonsurgical treatment option for people with essential tremor who are medication refractory. MRI-guided high-intensity focused ultrasound does not achieve healing, but can improve the quality of life. While its long-term effects are not yet established, the improvement in tremor score from baseline was durable at 1 year and 2 years following the treatment. To date, reported adverse events and side effects have been mild to moderate. Possible adverse events include gait difficulties, balance disturbances, paresthesias, headache, skin burns with ulcerations, skin retraction, scars, and blood clots. This procedure is contraindicated in pregnant women, persons who have non-MRI compatible implanted metallic devices, allergy to MR contrast agents, cerebrovascular disease, abnormal bleeding, hemorrhage and/or blood clotting disorders, advanced kidney disease or on dialysis, heart conditions, severe hypertension, and ethanol or substance abuse, among others. The US Food and Drug Administration (FDA) approved Insightec's Exablate Neuro system to treat essential tremor in 2016.

Another treatment for essential tremor is a surgical option; deep brain stimulation is used.

Prognosis 
Although essential tremor is often mild, people with severe tremor have difficulty performing many of their routine activities of daily living.  ET is generally progressive in most cases (sometimes rapidly, sometimes very slowly), and can be disabling in severe cases.

Epidemiology 
ET is one of the most common neurological diseases, with a prevalence around 4% in persons age 40 and older and considerably higher among persons in their 60s, 70s, and 80s, with an estimated 20% of individuals in their 90s and over. Aside from enhanced physiological tremor, it is the most common type of tremor and one of the most commonly observed movement disorders.

Society and culture 
Actress Katharine Hepburn (1907–2003) had an essential tremor, possibly inherited from her grandfather, that caused her head—and sometimes her hands—to shake. The tremor was noticeable by the time of her performance in the 1979 film The Corn Is Green, when critics mentioned the "palsy that kept her head trembling". Hepburn's tremor worsened in her later life.

Charles M. Schulz, American cartoonist and creator of the Peanuts comic strip, was affected during the last two decades of his life.

West Virginia Senator Robert Byrd also had essential tremor.

In 2010, musician Daryl Dragon of The Captain and Tennille was diagnosed with essential tremor, with the condition becoming so severe that Dragon was no longer able to play the keyboards.

Director-writer-producer-comedian Adam McKay was diagnosed with essential tremor.

Downton Abbey creator Julian Fellowes has the condition, as does the show's character Charlie Carson.

In 2022, Matthew Caws of Nada Surf and his son made a PSA called "Living with a Mild Essential Tremor".

Research
Harmaline is a widely used model of essential tremor (ET) in rodents. Harmaline is thought to act primarily on neurons in the inferior olive. Olivocerebellar neurons exhibit rhythmic excitatory action when harmaline is applied locally.
Harmane or harmaline has been implicated not only in essential tremors, but is also found in greater quantities in the brain fluid of people with Parkinson's disease as well as cancer. Higher levels of the neurotoxin are associated with greater severity of the tremors. Harmane is particularly abundant in meats, and certain cooking practices (e.g., long cooking times) increase its concentration, however, at least one study has shown that harmane blood concentrations do not go up after meat consumption in ET patients with already elevated harmane levels, where as the control group's harmane levels increase accordingly, suggesting that another factor, like a metabolic defect, may be responsible for the higher harmane levels in E.T. patients.

Caprylic acid is being researched as a possible treatment for essential tremor. It has currently been approved by the FDA and designated as GRAS, and is used as a food additive and has been studied as part of a ketogenic diet for treatment of epilepsy in children. Research on caprylic acid as a possible treatment for ET begun because researchers recognized that ethanol was effective in reducing tremor, and because of this, they looked into longer-chain alcohols reducing tremor. They discovered that 1-octanol reduced tremor and did not have the negative side effects of ethanol. Pharmacokinetic research on 1-octanol lead to the discovery that 1-octanol metabolized into caprylic acid in the body and that caprylic acid actually was the tremor-reducing agent. Many studies of the effects of caprylic acid on essential tremor have been done, including a dose-escalation study on ET patients and a study testing the effects of caprylic acid on central and peripheral tremor. The dose-escalation study examined doses of 8 mg/kg to 128 mg/kg and determined that these concentrations were safe with mild side effects. The maximum tolerated dose was not reached in this study. The study testing the effects of caprylic acid on central and peripheral tremors determined that caprylic acid reduced both.

Terminology 
This type of tremor is often referred to as "kinetic tremor". Essential tremor has been known as "benign essential tremor", but the adjective "benign" has been removed in recognition of the sometimes disabling nature of the disorder.

See also
 Intention tremor

References

External links 

 

Extrapyramidal and movement disorders